Gartmorn Dam is an artificial freshwater lake north-east of Alloa, Clackmannanshire, Scotland, UK, built in 1711-12 as a reservoir to supply water to hydraulic machines used in Alloa's mining industry. It was commissioned by John Erskine, 23rd and 6th Earl of Mar, to designs by George Sorocold, and is one of the earliest constructed reservoirs in Scotland.

History
Gartmorn Dam was commissioned by John, Earl of Mar, a Scottish noble and estate owner, who had received training in drawing and architectural design, and was said to be 'infected with the desease of building'. Its purpose was to provide a sufficient head and volume of water to drive mining pumps supporting the extractive industry of Alloa.

The dam, lake and associated waterworks were designed by and built, from 1711 to 1712, by English civil engineer George Sorocold. It is considered the earliest constructed reservoir in Scotland, and was for many years the largest artificial lake in Scotland.

In contemporary times, Gartmorn Dam is used for leisure activities. The weir and lade remain in good condition. In 2013, Scottish Water spent £440,000 to maintain the dam headwall and improve emergency water level reduction systems.

Notes

References

Landforms of Clackmannanshire
Reservoirs in Scotland
1712 establishments in Scotland